I was a streetcar route in Los Angeles, California. It was owned and operated by the Los Angeles Railway.

History
The route was created from a former section of the West 1st and West 6th Street Line in 1919. It ran from 2nd and San Pedro to Alvarado and West 6th, mainly on West 1st Street. In the rerouting scheme of 1920, the route was shortened to 2nd and Broadway at the eastern end. It was given the letter designation I in 1921. Further rounds of truncation occurred between 1921 and 1932, usually related to road works. These left the outbound terminal at Bonnie Brae Street, where passengers could connect to a D car. Service ceased after November 1, 1939.

Sources

External links
 I Line Archives — Pacific Electric Railway Historical Society
 

Los Angeles Railway routes
Railway services introduced in 1919
1919 establishments in California
1939 disestablishments in California